The Dunn Rock and Lake King Important Bird Area is a 759 km2 irregularly shaped tract of land in the south-eastern wheatbelt region of Western Australia.  It lies about 380 km south-east of Perth and 250 km north-east of Albany.

Description
The boundaries of the Important Bird Area (IBA) are defined by the remnant native vegetation associated with Pallarup, Dunn Rock and Lake King Nature Reserves as well as with that on adjacent unallocated Crown Land.  It is surrounded by land cleared for farming.  The site is one of the largest remaining mallee remnants within the wheatbelt, containing plant communities that have largely been cleared elsewhere.  It consists mainly of mallee, mallee-heath and salt pans, and receives around 400 mm of rain annually.

Birds
The IBA contains core habitat for the malleefowl and supports a significant population of the species.  Other birds for which the IBA is an important site include the Carnaby's cockatoo, red-capped parrot, western rosella, regent parrot, blue-breasted fairywren, purple-gaped honeyeater and western yellow robin.

References

Notes

Sources
 
 

Wheatbelt (Western Australia)
Important Bird Areas of Western Australia